Mahmoud Fisal Elhaddad (born March 10, 1986) is an Egyptian weightlifter. He competes in the 77 kg category.

Career
Elhaddad won silver in the snatch, gold in the clean and jerk, and overall gold at the 2008 African Championships, with a total of 336 kg.

He competed in weightlifting at the 2008 Summer Olympics in the 77 kg division finishing twelfth with 342 kg. This beat his previous personal best by 6 kg.

Notes and references

External links
 NBC profile
 Athlete Biography at beijing2008

Egyptian male weightlifters
1986 births
Living people
Weightlifters at the 2008 Summer Olympics
Olympic weightlifters of Egypt
African Games gold medalists for Egypt
African Games medalists in weightlifting
African Games silver medalists for Egypt
Competitors at the 2007 All-Africa Games
Place of birth missing (living people)
21st-century Egyptian people